Klokočovnik is a settlement in the Municipality of Slovenske Konjice in eastern Slovenia. It lies in the hills west of Loče on Loče Creek, a minor right tributary of the Dravinja River. The area is part of the traditional region of Styria. The municipality is now included in the Savinja Statistical Region.

References

External links
Klokočovnik at Geopedia

Populated places in the Municipality of Slovenske Konjice